Czaplicki (feminine: Czaplicka; plural: Czapliccy) is a Polish surname. Notable people with this surname include:

 Agata Czaplicki (born 1983), Swiss swimmer
 Edmund Czaplicki (1904–1940), Polish ice hockey player
 Maria Czaplicka (1884–1921), Polish anthropologist

See also
 

Polish-language surnames